John Hynes (born February 10, 1975) is an American professional ice hockey coach for the Nashville Predators of the National Hockey League (NHL). He previously served as the head coach of the New Jersey Devils.

Playing career
A 1997 graduate of Boston University, Hynes was a three-year letterman for the Terriers as a forward and participated in four straight NCAA Frozen Four tournaments. In 1995, Boston University captured the 1995 NCAA Division I National Championship in front of Hynes' home crowd in Providence, Rhode Island. Hynes earned a bachelor's degree in health and physical education.

Coaching career

College coaching career
Hynes was a former assistant coach at the University of Massachusetts Lowell during the 2000–01 season. In the 2002–03 season, he became an assistant coach for the University of Wisconsin.

USA Hockey
After the 2002–03 season, Hynes spent the next six seasons as a head coach with USA Hockey's National Team Development Program. He posted an overall record of 216–113–19–9 as the team's head coach. In 2008–09, he was the head coach of the U.S. Under-17 Development Team, posting a 42–17–6 record.

Hynes also led the U.S. Under-18 national team to three medals at the World Under-18 Championships, a gold in 2006, silver in 2004 and bronze in 2008. He was head coach of the U.S. national team at the 2008 World Junior championships, and was an assistant coach on the 2004 U.S. team that won a gold medal at the World Junior event.

Wilkes-Barre/Scranton Penguins
On August 4, 2009, Hynes was named an assistant coach for the Wilkes-Barre/Scranton Penguins, by general manager Ray Shero. He served as an assistant under coach Todd Reirden. On July 31, 2010, the WBS Penguins announced that Hynes would be the team's new head coach, after Reirden was promoted to an assistant coaching position for the Pittsburgh Penguins.

Under Hynes, the WBS Penguins qualified for the playoffs in all five seasons, reaching the conference finals twice.

New Jersey Devils
On June 2, 2015, Hynes was named as the new head coach of the New Jersey Devils of the National Hockey League (NHL), replacing Scott Stevens and Adam Oates. He became the youngest head coach in the NHL for the 2015–16 season. On April 5, 2018, Hynes coached the Devils to their first playoff appearance since the 2011–12 season when they defeated the Toronto Maple Leafs. However, they lost in the First Round to the Tampa Bay Lightning in five games. On January 3, 2019, Hynes signed a multi-year contract extension with the Devils.

On December 3, 2019, Hynes was fired by the Devils and was replaced by assistant coach Alain Nasreddine.

Nashville Predators
On January 7, 2020, Hynes was named as the new head coach of the Nashville Predators, replacing Peter Laviolette.

Awards
AHL
 2011 – Louis A. R. Pieri Memorial Award

Hynes was inducted into the Rhode Island Hockey Hall of Fame in 2023.

Head coaching record

NHL

AHL

See also
 List of NHL head coaches

References

External links
 

1975 births
Living people
Boston University Terriers men's ice hockey players
New Jersey Devils coaches
Sportspeople from Warwick, Rhode Island
Wilkes-Barre/Scranton Penguins head coaches
NCAA men's ice hockey national champions